Adam Forrest McCune (born 1985) is an American novelist.

Biography
McCune was born on July 18, 1985, in Virginia Beach, Virginia, to Keith and Grace McCune, and was raised in the Philippines and Russia.

In the year 2000, when McCune was fourteen, his father showed him a three-page short story based on the legend of the Pied Piper of Hamelin, and asked McCune to help him develop it. That short story became the 250-page novel, The Rats of Hamelin, which was published by Moody Publishers just before McCune's senior year at Wheaton College.
McCune has received degrees in English from Wheaton College, Illinois (BA, 2006), the University of Virginia (MA, 2011), and the University of North Carolina at Chapel Hill (PhD, 2016). He has taught British literature and composition at Baylor University.

Publications
 The Rats of Hamelin (Moody Publishers, 2005) co-authored with his father, Keith McCune
 "AIDS & the Church: An Opportunity to Show God's Love" (TEAM Horizons Vol. 2, Iss. 2, 2007)

References

External links
 Rats of Hamelin home page

1985 births
Living people
21st-century American novelists
American fantasy writers
American male novelists
People from Virginia Beach, Virginia
Wheaton College (Illinois) alumni
Novelists from Virginia
21st-century American male writers